Men's doubles at the 1999 Pan American Games was won by André Sá and Paulo Taicher of Brazil.

Medalists

Seeds

  Bob Bryan and Mike Bryan (Semifinalists)
  André Sá and Paulo Taicher (Champions)
  Óscar Ortíz and Marco Osorio (Finalists)
  Yohny Romero and Maurice Ruah (Semifinalists)

Draw

Final rounds

Top Half

Bottom Half

External links
Results

Men's doubles